Nick L. Salazar (April 18, 1929 – October 23, 2020) was an American politician who served as a Democratic member of the New Mexico House of Representatives, representing the 40th District from 1974 to 2019.

Early life and education 
Born in San Juan Pueblo, New Mexico, Salazar attended the University of California, Santa Barbara. He served in the United States Air Force, attaining the rank of sergeant.

Career 
Salazar served as a county commissioner from 1964 to 1968. From 1974 to 2019, he served as a member of the New Mexico House of Representatives for the 40th district. As House members are only paid per diem, Salazar worked as a mechanical technician at the Los Alamos National Laboratory.

In 2013, Salazar was presented with a lifetime achievement award from Los Alamos National Security for his contributions to the organizations in research. Salazar is also one of the longest served state representatives in the history New Mexico.

Personal life 
Salazar resided in Ohkay Owingeh, New Mexico. He and his wife had three children. He died in Española, New Mexico on October 23, 2020, at the age of 91.

References

External links
 Representative Nick L. Salazar at the NM House website
 Project Vote Smart - Representative Nick L. Salazar (NM) profile

1929 births
2020 deaths
21st-century American politicians
County commissioners in New Mexico
Hispanic and Latino American state legislators in New Mexico
Democratic Party members of the New Mexico House of Representatives
Military personnel from New Mexico
Native American state legislators in New Mexico
People from Ohkay Owingeh, New Mexico
University of California, Santa Barbara alumni